Janówka ,, is a village in the administrative district of Gmina Augustów, within Augustów County, Podlaskie Voivodeship, in north-eastern Poland.

Notable people
Romuald Kamiński (born 1955), bishop of Ełk

References

Villages in Augustów County
Trakai Voivodeship